Valangiman is a state assembly constituency in Thanjavur district of Tamil Nadu. It is a Scheduled Caste reserved constituency. It is one of the 234 State Legislative Assembly Constituencies in Tamil Nadu, in India. Elections and winners in the constituency are listed below.

Election results

2006

2001

1996

1991

1989

1984

1980

1977

1971

1967

References

External links
 

Former assembly constituencies of Tamil Nadu
Thanjavur district